Legislative elections were held in France on 5 July 1831. Only tax paying citizens were eligible to vote.

Results

References

Legislative elections in France
France
Legisative
France